The Arboretum de Born is a small arboretum located at 1400 metres altitude on the Plateau du Roi near Le Born, Lozère, Languedoc-Roussillon, France. It was created between 1964 and 1967 to study conifers suitable for reforestation, and according to Arbez et al., now contains 38 taxa (primarily conifers).

See also 
 Arboretum Curie
 List of botanical gardens in France

References 
 Michel Arbez et al., Les Ressources génétiques forestières en France, Bureau des ressources génétiques, Institut national de la recherche agronomique (France), Editions Quae, 1987, pages 29–30. 

Born, Arboretum de
Born, Arboretum de